The 2012 Torfaen County Borough Council election took place on 3 May 2012 to elect members of Torfaen County Borough Council in Wales. This was on the same day as other 2012 United Kingdom local elections. The Council shifted from no overall control to Labour.

Results

|}

Ward results

Abersychan

Blaenafon/Blaenavon

Bryn-wern

Coed Efa/Coed Eva

Gogledd Croesyceiliog/Croesyceiliog North

De Croesyceiliog/Croesyceiliog South

Cwmynysgoi/Cwmynyscoy

Fairwater

Greenmeadow

Llantarnam

Gogledd Llanyrafon/Llanyrafon North

De Llanyrafon/Llanyrafon South

New Inn

Panteg

Pontnewydd

Pontnewynydd

Pont-y-pŵl/Pontypool

St Cadocs a Phen-y-garn/St Cadocs and Penygarn

Llanfihangel Llantarnam/St Dials

Snatchwood

Trefddyn/Trevethin

Two Locks

Cwmbrân/Upper Cwmbran

Waunfelin/Wainfelin

References

2012
Torfaen